Farquhar is a surname of Scottish origin, derived from the Scottish Gaelic fearchar, from fear ("man") and car ("beloved"). Farquharson is a further derivation of the name, meaning "son of Farquhar". The name originated as a given name, but had become established as a surname by the 14th century.

The name's pronunciation depends on the person, family, and place. In Scotland it can be .

Notable people with the surname include:

United Kingdom and Ireland 
Farquhar MacTaggart, First Earl of Ross
Anthony Farquhar (born 1940), Roman Catholic Auxiliary bishop
Farquhar baronets, British aristocrats
Gary Farquhar  (born 1971), Scottish footballer
George Farquhar (1678–1707), Irish dramatist
George Farquhar (priest) (died 1927), Dean of St Andrews, Dunkeld and Dunblane
Helen Farquhar (1859–1953), British numismatist
Horace Farquhar, 1st Earl Farquhar (1844–1923), British financier and politician
J. N. Farquhar (1861–1929), Scottish educational missionary to Calcutta, and an Orientalist
John Farquhar (footballer) (born 1924), Scottish footballer 
John Farquhar (gunpowder dealer) (1751–1826), Scottish millionaire dealer in gunpowder
Kellyanne Farquhar, Scottish actress
Meg Farquhar (1910–1988), British professional golfer
Peter Farquhar (1946–2015), Scottish novelist and teacher of English
Regan Farquhar (born 1978), birth name of rapper Busdriver
Ryan Farquhar (born 1976), competitive motorcycle racer
Simon Farquhar (born 1972), Scottish playwright
William Farquhar (1774–1839), Scottish major-general of the East India Company

North Americans
Arthur Briggs Farquhar (1838–1925), American industrialist and businessman
Danny Farquhar (born 1987), American baseball pitcher
Douglas Farquhar (1921–2005), Scottish-American soccer player
Francis P. Farquhar (1887–1974), president of the Sierra Club and author of Place Names of the High Sierra
Henry Hallowell Farquhar (1884–1968), professor at Harvard Business School
James Augustus Farquhar (1842–1930), master mariner and captain in the late 19th and early 20th century Nova Scotia, Canada
John M. Farquhar (1832–1918), United States Representative from New York and recipient of the Medal of Honor
John Hanson Farquhar (1818–1873), United States Representative from Indiana
JW Farquhar (born 1937/1938), American musician and singer-songwriter
Marilyn Farquhar (1928–2019), American cellular biologist
Norman von Heldreich Farquhar (1840–1907), rear admiral in the United States Navy, for whom the USS Farquhar (DE-139) and USS Farquhar (DD-304) are named
Percival Farquhar (1865–1953), American investor with extensive interests in Latin America and Russia
Robert W. Farquhar (1932–2015), American spaceflight mission specialist 
Robin Hugh Farquhar (born 1938), Canadian academic leader
Shawn Farquhar (born 1962), Canadian illusionist
Stan Farquhar (1916–1992), Canadian politician, son of Thomas
Thomas Farquhar (1875–1962), Canadian politician
William Henry Farquhar (1813–1887), prominent citizen of Montgomery County, Maryland

Australasians
David Farquhar (composer) (1928–2007), a New Zealand composer
Edward Allan Farquhar (1871–1935), shipping agent then Harbors Board chairman in South Australia
Graham Farquhar (born 1947), plant physiologist and biophysicist 
Murray Farquhar (1918–1993), magistrate, convicted and jailed in 1985 for corrupt influence
Scott Farquhar (born 1979), Australian businessman
Wally Farquhar (1875–1960), Australian cricketer
Stuart Farquhar (1982-), New Zealand athlete

See also
Farquhar MacTaggart, medieval Scottish magnate
Farquahr, an American folk band
Farquharson
Lord Farquaad, fictional character in Shrek films
MacFarquhar
Robert Farquhar (disambiguation)
Ffarquhar Branch Line, in The Railway Series books of Rev. W. Awdry

References

Scottish surnames